Makama may refer to:

Makama, alternative spelling of Maqama

People
Aliyu Makama (1905–1980), Nigerian politician
Ibrahim Makama Misau, Nigerian politician
Mamman Makama (born 1946), Nigerian sprinter
Neo Makama (born 1981), Lesothan footballer 
Rimini Makama, Nigerian lawyer and business executive
Thuli Brilliance Makama, Swazi environmental attorney

See also
Gidan Makama Museum Kano, Nigeria